Hemiphylacus is a genus of flowering plants endemic to Mexico. In the APG III classification system, it is placed in the family Asparagaceae, subfamily Asparagoideae (formerly the family Asparagaceae sensu stricto).

Species:

Hemiphylacus alatostylus L.Hern. - Guanajuto, Querétaro, San Luis Potosí
Hemiphylacus hintoniorum L.Hern. - Nuevo León
Hemiphylacus latifolius S.Watson - Coahuila
Hemiphylacus mahindae L.Hern. - Oaxaca, Puebla
Hemiphylacus novogalicianus L.Hern. - Aguascalientes

References

Asparagaceae genera
Asparagoideae
Endemic flora of Mexico